wXw, WXW, WxW, wxw, or variant may refer to:

wXw
 Westside Xtreme Wrestling a German professional wrestling promotion

WXW
 World Xtreme Wrestling an American professional wrestling promotion 
 Waswo X Waswo an American Photographer

wxw
 ISO 639-3 code wxw, which denotes Wardandi, a dialect of the Nyungar language

WxW
 world versus world, aka "WvW", a game mode, see Guild Wars 2